Ivy Terrace, also known as the Gov. Lawrence V. (Lon) Stephens House , is a historic home located at Jefferson City, Cole County, Missouri. Built in 1893, it is a -story, Queen Anne style frame dwelling. It sits on a foundation of rough limestone blocks.  It features a rounded tower, wraparound verandah, high and irregular roof, fish scale shingles, and asymmetrical facade.  Lawrence Vest Stephens occupied the dwelling while serving as Missouri State Treasurer, for three years prior to becoming governor in 1897.

It was listed on the National Register of Historic Places in 1990. It is located in the Capitol Avenue Historic District.

References

Individually listed contributing properties to historic districts on the National Register in Missouri
Houses on the National Register of Historic Places in Missouri
Queen Anne architecture in Missouri
Houses completed in 1893
Buildings and structures in Jefferson City, Missouri
National Register of Historic Places in Cole County, Missouri
1893 establishments in Missouri